David Mulica (born March 17, 1949) is a former American cyclist. He competed in the team pursuit event at the 1972 Summer Olympics.

References

External links
 

1949 births
Living people
American male cyclists
Olympic cyclists of the United States
Cyclists at the 1972 Summer Olympics
Sportspeople from Santa Monica, California
American track cyclists
Pan American Games medalists in cycling
Medalists at the 1971 Pan American Games
Pan American Games bronze medalists for the United States